The  Frankfurt proposals (also called the  Frankfurt memorandum) were a Coalition peace initiative designed by Austrian foreign minister Klemens von Metternich. It was offered to French Emperor Napoleon I in November 1813 after he had suffered a decisive defeat at the Battle of Leipzig. The goal was a peaceful end to the War of the Sixth Coalition. The Allies had reconquered most of Germany up to the Rhine, but they had not decided on the next step. Metternich took the initiative. The Allies, meeting in Frankfurt, drafted the proposals under Metternich's close supervision. The British diplomat in attendance, Lord Aberdeen, misunderstood London's position and accepted the moderate terms.

The proposal was that Napoleon would remain as Emperor of France, but France would be reduced to what the French revolutionaries claimed as France's "natural borders." The natural borders were the Pyrenees, the Alps, and the Rhine. France would retain control of Belgium, Savoy, and the Rhineland (the west bank of the Rhine), conquered and annexed during the early wars of the French Revolution, while giving up other occupied territories, including parts of Spain, Poland, and the Netherlands, as well as most of Italy and Germany east of the Rhine.

At a private meeting at Dresden in June, Napoleon and Metternich had already discussed the terms. The final version was relayed to Napoleon by the Baron de Saint-Aignon in November. 
Metternich told Napoleon that these were the best terms the Allies were likely to offer; after further victories, the terms would become harsher and harsher. Metternich's motivation was to maintain France as a balance against Russian threats, while ending the highly destabilizing series of wars.

Napoleon, expecting to win the war, delayed too long and lost this opportunity. By December, Austria had signed treaties with the Allies, and London rejected the terms because they might allow Belgium to become a base for an invasion of Britain, and as a result the offer was withdrawn. When the Allies invaded France in late 1813, Napoleon was heavily outnumbered and tried to reopen peace negotiations on the basis of accepting the Frankfurt proposals. The Allies now had new, harsher terms that included the retreat of France to its 1791 boundaries, which meant the loss of Belgium and the Rhineland. Napoleon adamantly refused and was finally forced to abdicate on April 6, 1814.

See also
 Klemens von Metternich
 Napoleonic Wars

Notes

Further reading
 Roberts, Andrew. Napoleon: A Life (2014)
 Dwyer, Philip. Citizen Emperor: Napoleon in Power (2013) ch 22
 Dwyer, Philip G. "Self-Interest versus the Common Cause: Austria, Prussia and Russia against Napoleon," Journal of Strategic Studies (2008) 31#4 pp 605–632; explores why the Coalition held together so well in 1813-1814
 Esdaile, Charles. Napoleon's Wars: An International History 1803-1815 (2007) pp 217–18
 Kissinger, Henry A. A World Restored; Metternich, Castlereagh and the Problems of Peace 1812-1822 (1957) pp 97–103
 
 
 Ross, Stephen T. European Diplomatic History 1789-1815: France against Europe (1969) pp 342–344
 Ward, A.W. and G. P. Gooch, eds. The Cambridge History of British Foreign Policy, 1783–1919: Volume I: 1783–1815 (1921) online pp 416–35;

Napoleonic Wars
1813 in Europe